"Everlasting Love" is a song by English singer and songwriter Howard Jones from his fourth studio album, Cross That Line (1989). Written by Jones, it was released as the album's first single on 20 February 1989.

The song reached #12 in the United States on the Billboard Hot 100 chart in the early summer of that year, and also peaked at #19 on the Modern Rock Tracks chart, the first of only two singles to appear there. It also spent two weeks at #1 on the US adult contemporary chart, the singer's second chart-topper on this tally (following "No One Is to Blame" from 1986). In his native UK, where Jones had enjoyed numerous pop hits, "Everlasting Love" failed to have as much of an impact as earlier singles, and it stalled at #62 on the UK Singles Chart. The song was co-produced by ex-Tears for Fears band member Ian Stanley.

This was the first of Jones' singles to be released on CD.

Track listing
7" & cassette
"Everlasting Love" – 4:20
"The Brutality of Fact" – 4:27

12"
"Everlasting Love (808 Mix)" – 6:28
"Everlasting Love" – 4:20
"The Brutality of Fact" – 4:27
"Power of the Media" – 4:47

3" CD
"Everlasting Love" – 4:20
"The Brutality of Fact" – 4:27
"Power of the Media" – 4:47
"No One Is to Blame" – 4:13

Limited Edition 3" CD
"Everlasting Love (The Institute Mix)" – 4:48
"Hide and Seek (Orchestral)" – 7:09
"Conditioning (Live in Philadelphia)" – 5:26

Chart positions

Weekly charts

Year-end charts

Personnel
Howard Jones – vocals; keyboards
Ian Stanley – keyboards 
Chris Hughes – drums
Andy Ross – guitar
Martin Jones – guitar
Sandy McLelland – additional vocals

References

External links
12" single release info at discogs.com
The Official Howard Jones Website Discography

1989 singles
Howard Jones (English musician) songs
Songs written by Howard Jones (English musician)
1989 songs
Warner Music Group singles
Elektra Records singles
Song recordings produced by Ian Stanley
Song recordings produced by Ross Cullum